Mark Clennon (born August 13, 1990) is a Jamaican Canadian singer, musician, and actor.

Early life
Clennon was born in Kingston, Jamaica, where he began taking piano lessons and writing songs in his youth. At the age of 15, he was relocated to Florida with his family, before moving to Toronto, Canada to pursue his music career when he turned 21.

Career
Clennon began to release music on Soundcloud in the early 2010s, but upon signing a record deal with Montreal-based record label Moonshine, he deleted all of his music off the internet to "start from scratch". In an interview with The Gleaner, Clennon said that he began to take his music career seriously in 2013. 

Clennon's first EP, When the Smoke Clears, which consists of four songs, was released on August 19, 2016. 

His first official single was "Blood", which attracted acclaim from international music blogs. A music video was released on January 18, 2017. His second single, "Don't Die", was released later that year and was called "powerful" by Complex writer Katie Kelly. Another single, "Find You", was released with an accompanying music video on February 27, 2017, through Paper. 

Around this time, Clennon left Moonshine and signed with another Canadian record label, Bonsound. He subsequently released his second EP, Passion, produced by Grammy Award-winning duo Rainer + Grimm, in 2019.  

His third EP, Foreign, was released in 2021 and featured the singles "Part of Your World", "Not Perfect", and "Don't Start a Fire". 

Outside of music, Clennon has starred in Canadian director M. H. Murray's 2020 short film Ghost, which screened at the 30th Inside Out Film and Video Festival, the 5th Paris Independent Film Festival, the 34th Connecticut LGBTQ Film Festival, and the 47th Seattle International Film Festival. Clennon's song "Not Perfect" is featured in the film. 

During 2022 Pride Month, Clennon released a single, "Kingston", with an accompanying music video that featured a romantic storyline between Clennon and male model Jean-Julien Hazoumi. The music video, filmed in Kingston, became the first music video shot in Jamaica to feature an on-screen romance between two men. A live performance of "Kingston" was also released online by the Recording Academy's "Global Spin" series.

Musical style
Clennon's music has been described as both pop and R&B, with dancehall and soul influences.

See also 

 LGBT rights in Jamaica

References

External links
 

1990 births
Living people
Canadian people of Jamaican descent
Canadian male singers